L. fulgida may refer to:

 Lampria fulgida, a robber fly
 Lamprima fulgida, a stag beetle
 Lucilia fulgida, a blow fly
 Limnesia fulgida, an aquatic mite